Bedworth railway station serves the town of Bedworth in Warwickshire, England. The station, and all trains serving it, are operated by West Midlands Trains.

History

Original station

The original Bedworth station operated between 1850 and 1965. The London and North Western Railway (LNWR) opened the station, along with the Coventry to Nuneaton Line on 12 September 1850.

On 18 January 1965 British Railways (BR) withdrew passenger services from the line and closed Bedworth station, along with all of the other intermediate stations on the line.

Reopening
BR resumed passenger services on the line in 1987 and reopened Bedworth station in 1988. The official opening was on 10 May 1988 and normal passenger services operated from 16 May 1988. The rebuilt station was constructed on the site of the original, and was built with platforms long enough to hold a three coach train. The construction cost in 1988 was £200,000 (approximately £479,000 in 2014 prices). Half of the cost was met by Warwickshire County Council and Nuneaton and Bedworth Borough Council.

However, as part of changes to the track layout at Nuneaton station, the link to the Nuneaton to Leicester Line was removed and thereafter trains on the line ran between Coventry and Nuneaton only.

Upgrade
On 14 December 2011, the UK Government announced an £18.8 million project to upgrade the line, that includes Bedworth platforms being lengthened and the service frequency being upgraded from hourly to half-hourly. The platform lengthening was completed in early 2015 and two new stations on the line, Bermuda Park and Coventry Arena, opened in January 2016.

Services
On Sundays, hourly services operate from late morning onwards with southbound trains terminating at Coventry.

References

External links

Historical photographs of Bedworth railway station

Railway stations in Warwickshire
DfT Category F2 stations
Former London and North Western Railway stations
Railway stations in Great Britain opened in 1850
Railway stations in Great Britain closed in 1965
Railway stations in Great Britain opened in 1988
Reopened railway stations in Great Britain
Railway stations served by West Midlands Trains
Beeching closures in England
Bedworth